The R52 is a provincial route in North West, South Africa that connects Biesiesvlei with Rustenburg via Lichtenburg and Koster.

Route 
The R52 begins in Biesiesvlei (20 kilometres north-east of Sannieshof), at a junction with the N14 National Route. It begins by going north-east for 36 kilometres, through Itekeng, to the town of Lichtenburg. It reaches a junction with the R503 Route and the R505 Route (Nelson Mandela Drive).

All 3 routes form one road northwards through the Lichtenburg CBD as Nelson Mandela Drive up to the junction with Gerrit Maritz Street, where the R52 splits from the R503/R505 to become Gerrit Maritz Street eastwards. The R52 heads north-east for 84 kilometres, meeting the R53 Route, to the town of Koster, where it turns northwards in the town centre, becoming Rissik Street, and meets the R509 Route. After the Reagile suburb of Koster, the R53 turns to the north-east and heads for 35 kilometres to reach its end at a t-junction with the N4 National Route (Platinum Highway) just west of Rustenburg.

References

External links
 Routes Travel Info

52
Provincial routes in South Africa